One of the first times in which Jean-Paul Sartre discussed the concept of situation was in his 1943 Being and Nothingness, where he famously said that 

Earlier in 1939, in his short story The Childhood of a Leader, collected in his famous The Wall, referring to a fake turd, he said that in pranks "There is more destructive power in them than in all the works of Lenin."
Another famous use of the term was in 1945, in his editorial of the first issue of  Les Temps modernes (Modern Times); arguing the principle of the responsibility of the intellectual towards his own times and the principle of an engaged literature, he summarized: "the writer is in a situation with his epoch."

An, influential use of the concept was in the context of theatre, in his 1947 essay For a Theatre of Situations. A passage that has been frequently quoted is the following, in which he defines the Theater of Situations:

He then published his series Situations, with ten volumes on Literary Critiques and What Is Literature? (1947), the third volume (1949), Portraits (1964), Colonialism and Neocolonialism (1964), Problems of Marxism, Part 1 (1966),  Problems of Marxism, Part 2 (1967), The Family Idiot (1971-2), Autour de 1968 and Melanges (1972), and Life/Situations: Essays Written and Spoken (1976).

Guy Debord, Letterist and Situationist International
Sartre's concept of Situation was reprised by Guy Debord at least since the times of the Letterist International. In January 1954, the Letterist International declared: "The new beauty will be that of THE SITUATION, that is to say, provisional and lived."

Claire Gilman called Sartre a "father figure" for the Situationist International, and wrote that "Sartre and his philosophy of the situation are fundamental to the SI's notion of everyday life authentically experienced". The relationship between Sartre's philosophy of the situation and the Situationist International is clarified by Peter Wollen in his essay Bitter victory.

References

Further reading
Sartre, Jean-Paul. (1973). "Théâtre populaire et théâtre bourgeois". Théâtre populaire. n° 15, 1955. Also in Un théâtre de situations.

Jean-Paul Sartre